Jurgens Ci Caravans Ltd, founded in 1952, was South Africa’s oldest and largest caravan manufacturer. The company operated from a head office in Ga-Rankuwa, north of Pretoria, Gauteng, and had a canvas division in New Germany, KwaZulu-Natal. The company was founded in Germiston in 1952 by Geert Jurgens and his sons, Dirk and Rieks, who emigrated to South Africa from the Netherlands in 1950.

Over a history spanning 60 years, the company helped to drive South Africa’s domestic tourism market and had responded to changing market needs by adding add pop-tops, off-road caravans, motorhomes, truck bodies, luggage trailers, canvas products and off-road trailers to its product range.

The company was a wholly owned subsidiary of Imperial Holdings Ltd. Jurgens provided employment for 970 in South Africa and had 70 employees in Australia.

Jurgens Ci had a dealer network in South Africa and Namibia, and exported units to Australia, the Netherlands and New Zealand. Jurgens also had a production facility in Melbourne, Australia.

References

External links

Caravan and travel trailer manufacturers
Vehicle manufacturers of South Africa
1952 establishments in South Africa
Vehicle manufacturing companies established in 1952
Manufacturing companies based in the City of Tshwane
Companies based in Germiston